The Chinese babax (Pterorhinus lanceolatus) is a species of bird in the family Leiothrichidae.
It is found in China, Hong Kong, India, and Myanmar.
Its natural habitats are subtropical or tropical moist lowland forests and subtropical or tropical moist montane forests.

This species was formerly placed in the genus Babax but following the publication of a comprehensive molecular phylogenetic study in 2018, it was moved to the resurrected genus Pterorhinus.

References

Collar, N. J. & Robson C. 2007. Family Timaliidae (Babblers)  pp. 70 – 291 in; del Hoyo, J., Elliott, A. & Christie, D.A. eds. Handbook of the Birds of the World, Vol. 12. Picathartes to Tits and Chickadees. Lynx Edicions, Barcelona.

External links
Image and classification at ADW

Chinese babax
Birds of China
Birds of Myanmar
Birds of Yunnan
Chinese babax
Taxonomy articles created by Polbot
Taxobox binomials not recognized by IUCN